Somos Néctar (also known as: Somos Néctar, la película) is a 2017 Peruvian comedy film directed by Coco Bravo (in his directorial debut) and written by César de María. It is inspired by the Peruvian musical orchestra Grupo Néctar, serving as a tribute after the death of the original members in a car accident in Argentina in 2007. It stars Mabel Duclós, Junior Silva, Óscar Beltrán, Carlos Casella and Deyvis Orosco. The film premiered on October 5, 2017, in Peruvian theaters.

Synopsis 
10 years have passed since the car accident that left a great void in the fans of the Grupo Néctar, so we find ourselves with the story of Sarita, an old woman who despite the Alzheimer does not forget the promise that his three grandchildren made him almost 10 years ago, a concert with Johnny Orosco and his group Nectar at his home. This is how the adventure of Tato, Memo and Gianfranco begins, three grandchildren willing to do anything to not disappoint or hurt the feelings of their beloved grandmother.

Cast 

 Mabel Duclós as Sarita
 Junior Silva as Memo
 Oscar Beltran
 Carlos Casella
 Deyvis Orosco as himself
 Mayella Lloclla
 Monica Torres
 Oscar Beltran
 Sheyla Rojas

Production 
The film began filming on May 22, 2017, in the middle of Deyvis Orosco's concert on the esplanade Plaza Norte. The filming ended on July 15, 2022.

Reception 
Somos Néctar attracted more than 60,000 people on its first day on the billboard. At the end of its first week in theaters, the film attracted 100,000 viewers. At the end of the year the film attracted 308,523 viewers to the theater, becoming the seventh highest grossing Peruvian film of 2017.

References 

2017 films
2017 comedy films
Peruvian comedy films
2010s Spanish-language films
2010s Peruvian films
Films set in Peru
Films shot in Peru
Films about families
Films about old age
Films about music and musicians
Films about musical groups
2017 directorial debut films